|}

The Lansdown Fillies' Stakes is a Listed flat horse race in Great Britain open to fillies aged three years and up.

It is run at Bath over a distance of 5 furlongs and 10 yards (
), and it is scheduled to take place each year in April.

The race was first run in 1999.

Records

Most successful horse (2 wins):
 Indian Maiden – 2005,2006

Leading jockey  (2 wins):
 Ted Durcan – Indian Maiden (2005,2006)
 Adam Kirby -  Place In My Heart (2013), Priceless (2017) 

Leading trainer  (3 wins):
 Clive Cox – Gilt Edge Girl (2010), Place In My Heart (2013), Priceless (2017)

Winners

See also
 Horse racing in Great Britain
 List of British flat horse races

References

Racing Post:

Flat races in Great Britain
Bath Racecourse
Open sprint category horse races
1999 establishments in England
Recurring sporting events established in 1999